<noinclude>

The Byzantine Empire, also referred to as the Eastern Roman Empire or Byzantium, was the continuation of the Roman Empire primarily in its eastern provinces during Late Antiquity and the Middle Ages, when its capital city was Constantinople. It survived the fragmentation and fall of the Western Roman Empire in the 5th century AD and continued to exist for an additional thousand years until the fall of Constantinople to the Ottoman Empire in 1453. During most of its existence, the empire remained the most powerful economic, cultural, and military force in Europe. The terms "Byzantine Empire" and "Eastern Roman Empire" were coined after the end of the realm; its citizens continued to refer to their empire as the Roman Empire, and to themselves as Romans—a term which Greeks continued to use for themselves into Ottoman times. Although the Roman state continued and its traditions were maintained, modern historians prefer to differentiate the Byzantine Empire from Ancient Rome as it was centred on Constantinople instead of Rome, oriented towards Greek rather than Latin culture, and characterised by Eastern Orthodox Christianity. 

During the high period of the Roman Empire known as the Pax Romana, the western parts of the empire went through Latinization, while the eastern parts of the empire maintained to a large degree their Hellenistic culture. Several events from the 4th to 6th centuries mark the period of transition during which the Roman Empire's Greek East and Latin West diverged. Constantine I reorganised the empire, made Constantinople the capital, and legalised Christianity. Under Theodosius I, Christianity became the state religion, and other religious practices were proscribed. In the reign of Heraclius, the empire's military and administration were restructured, and Greek was gradually adopted for official use in place of Latin. 

The borders of the empire fluctuated through several cycles of decline and recovery. During the reign of Justinian I, the empire reached its greatest extent after the fall of the west, re-conquering much of the historically Roman western Mediterranean coast, including Africa, Italy and Rome, which it held for two more centuries. The Byzantine–Sasanian War of 602–628 exhausted the empire's resources, and during the early Muslim conquests of the 7th century, it lost its richest provinces, Egypt and Syria, to the Rashidun Caliphate. It then lost Africa to the Umayyads in 698, before the empire was rescued by the Isaurian dynasty.

During the Macedonian dynasty (9th–11th centuries), the empire expanded again and experienced the two-century-long Macedonian Renaissance, which came to an end with the defeat by Seljuk Turks at the Battle of Manzikert in 1071. Civil wars and the ensuing Seljuk invasion led to the loss of most of Asia Minor. The empire recovered during the Komnenian restoration, and by the 12th century, Constantinople was the largest and wealthiest city in Europe. 

The empire was delivered a mortal blow during the Fourth Crusade when Constantinople was sacked in 1204 and the territories that the empire formerly governed were divided into competing Byzantine Greek and Latin realms. Despite the eventual recovery of Constantinople in 1261, the Byzantine Empire remained only one of several small rival states in the area for the final two centuries of its existence. Its remaining territories were progressively annexed by the Ottomans in the Byzantine–Ottoman wars over the 14th and 15th centuries. 

The fall of Constantinople to the Ottoman Empire in 1453 marked the end of the Byzantine Empire. Refugees fleeing the city after its capture would settle in Italy and other parts of Europe, helping to ignite the Renaissance. The Empire of Trebizond was conquered eight years later when its eponymous capital surrendered to Ottoman forces after it was besieged in 1461. The last Byzantine rump state, the Principality of Theodoro, was conquered by the Ottomans in 1475. Arguments can be made that the fall of the Byzantine Empire to the Ottomans is one of several factors contributing to the end of the Middle Ages and the start of the early modern period.

Nomenclature 

Historians first used the term "Byzantine" as a label for the later years of the Roman Empire in 1557, 104 years after the empire's collapse, when the German historian Hieronymus Wolf published his work Corpus Historiæ Byzantinæ, a collection of historical sources. According to Anthony Kaldellis, Athenian historian Laonikos Chalkokondyles in the mid 15th century advocated a neo-Hellenic identity of the Romans and was the first to use the term in this way. The term comes from "Byzantium", the name of the city to which Constantine moved his capital, leaving Rome, and rebuilt under the new name of Constantinople. The older name of the city was rarely used from this point onward except in historical or poetic contexts. The publication in 1648 of the Byzantine du Louvre (Corpus Scriptorum Historiae Byzantinae), and in 1680 of Du Cange's Historia Byzantina further popularised the use of "Byzantine" among French authors, such as Montesquieu. However, it was not until the mid-19th century that the term came into general use in the Western world. Kaldellis claims this was a result of politics of the Crimean War, which included Greece's Megali Idea.

The Byzantine Empire was known to its inhabitants as the "Roman Empire" or the "Empire of the Romans", Romania, the Roman Republic, or in Greek "Rhōmais". The inhabitants called themselves Romaioi, and even as late as the 19th century Greeks typically referred to Modern Greek as Romaiika "Romaic". After 1204, when the Byzantine Empire was mostly confined to its purely Greek provinces, the term 'Hellenes' was increasingly used instead.

While the Byzantine Empire had a multi-ethnic character during most of its history and preserved Romano-Hellenistic traditions, it became identified by its western and northern contemporaries with its increasingly predominant Greek element. The Libri Carolini published in the 790s made the first mention of the term "Empire of the Greeks" (Latin: Imperium Graecorum) and Imperator Graecorum (Emperor of the Greeks), which was an insult first formally attributed to Pope John XIII, with western medieval sources thereafter using the same terminology. This was done to reestablish equal imperial dignity to the Empire of the Franks and what would later become known as the Holy Roman Empire.

No such distinction existed in the Islamic and Slavic worlds, where the empire was more straightforwardly seen as the continuation of the Roman Empire. In the Islamic world, the Roman Empire was known primarily as Rûm. The name millet-i Rûm, or "Roman nation," was used by the Ottomans until the 20th century to refer to the former subjects of the Byzantine Empire, that is, the Orthodox Christian community within Ottoman realms.

History

Early Byzantine History 
The following subchapters describe the transition from the pagan, multicultural Roman Empire ruled from Rome, to the Byzantine Empire, a continuation of the Roman Empire with Latin-inspired administration but culturally predominantly Greek and ruled from Constantinople.

Early history of the Greek-Roman east 

During the fourth century BC, Alexander the Great conquered the Achaemenid Empire which brought huge swathes of land from the eastern part of Mediterranean Basin all the way to the Indus river under Greek influence. When Alexander died in 323 BC, much of the land his Macedonian Empire had conquered was split into successor kingdoms known as the "Diadochi", that almost immediately entered into wars against each other known as the Diadochi wars. These Diadochi kingdoms went through different degrees of Hellenisation over the centuries and created a Hellenistic world across the eastern Mediterranean basin. During the 4th century BC, the Roman Republic was a city-state in the Italian region of Latium that, through wars and treaties, expanded its influence across the Italian peninsula. At the start of the 3rd century BC, Rome had emerged victorious from the Samnite wars and was at that point the dominant hegemon of the peninsula, though Rome had yet to be challenged by another great power. This changed with first the Pyrrhic war that saw the Greek Kingdom of Epirus intervening in a war against Rome to protect the Greek city-states of southern Italy. Later, Rome clashed with Carthage in a series of wars known as the Punic wars from 264 BC onward, which in the Second Punic War saw Macedon entering the conflict on the side of Carthage. When the Roman Republic brought the Punic Wars to a close in 146 BC with the sack of Carthage, it also brought half a century of Roman-Greek wars that was running parallel to the Punic Wars to a close with the Sack of Corinth. 

By the end of the Roman-Greek Wars, Rome had conquered and incorporated Macedonia, parts of Thrace, and the rest of Greece into the provinces Macedonia and Achaia under the direct rule of the Rome. 13 years later in 133 BC, the king of Pergamon Attalus III died and bequeathed the whole of his kingdom to Rome in order to avoid another bloody conquest. This gained Rome the province of Roman Asia and a permanent foothold in the east. Rome had by these conquests, started a centuries-long process of incorporating much of the Hellenised eastern parts of the Mediterranean basin under Roman rule, with the first Roman emperor Augustus' conquest of Egypt being the most notable. These contacts with the Greeks in the east ended up in the Roman conquest of Greece, but also led to the intertwining of the Roman and Greek worlds. By the second century AD, the Roman Empire reached its height during the reign of emperor Hadrian in a period known as Pax Romana. Rome had conquered territories covering the Balkans, Asia Minor the whole Mediterranean basin and coastal regions in southwestern Europe, Gaul and Britannia and large swathes of North Africa. These territories were home to many different cultural groups, both urban populations and rural populations. The western parts of the Roman Empire went through  Romanization while the eastern Hellenised parts of the empire kept much of their Hellenistic culture intact. 

Generally speaking, the eastern Mediterranean provinces were more urbanised and developed than the western provinces, having previously been united under the Macedonian Empire and Hellenised by the influence of Greek culture. The emperor, during the period of Pax Romana, reigned in a system known as the Principate that kept the veneer of republican constitution alive in the minds of the Romans, with the emperor known as princeps civitatis, derived from a senatorial title Princeps Senatus "the first among equals" in the Senate. The emperor was known as "first among equals" in terms of all Roman citizens. The hallmark of the Principate form of government was the combination of republican institutions with that of an informal monarchical regime. The regime also often ruled its conquered provinces with a few hundred Roman provincial administrators, whose authority was above the local rulers and their already established power structure, which was left in place after the conquest. This was common, especially in the eastern Greek provinces of the Roman empire.

Crisis of the third century and reforms of the empire 

The third century AD showed some remarkable development for the empire as well as a potential decline and collapse. Emperor Caracalla's edict in 212 AD known as the Antoninian constitution delivered Roman citizenship to every free man in the empire, starting the decline of the importance of the city of Rome and indeed of Roman Italy for the Roman Empire. By the mid-third century AD, Pax Romana had come to an end, and several crises hit the empire simultaneously in a period known to history as the Crisis of the third century. This period saw the empire exposed to rampant inflation, natural disasters, secession and civil wars taking places over several decades. The secessions ended with emperor Aurelian’s conquest of the secessionist Palmyrene Empire and Gallic Empire in 273 and 274 AD, as Aurelian unified a splintered empire which, according to many historians, should have been doomed. However, Aurelian was assassinated in 276 AD, sparking additional civil wars. The crisis came to an end only through the ascension of emperor Diocletian to the throne. The West suffered more heavily from these decades of crisis due to this distinction between the established and more prosperous Hellenised East and the younger colonized and Romanized West that had persisted. This cultural division of the Roman Empire into an eastern Greek and western Latin part became increasingly important in later centuries, leading to a gradual estrangement of the two Roman worlds. 

Emperor Diocletian created the administrative system known as the Dominate to guarantee security in all endangered regions of his empire. The dominate was in comparison with the principate, a huge imperial bureaucracy, which laid the foundations for the power structure of the later Eastern Roman Empire. With this came a redistricting and reduction of Roman provinces. Diocletian scrapped any pretense of republican rule as the emperor moved away from formally being merely "Princeps" to being "Dominus" - Lord and master. Diocletian also formally finished the process of restructuring the empire, from being a colonial-styled empire ruled by Rome and Roman Italians in the first century AD to a larger imperial entity where the emperor's court was not bound to the city of Rome or Italy, now only one Roman imperial province among many. The norm of emperors being Roman Italians was first broken by emperor Trajan who came from Hispania. By the time of the Severan dynasty, most emperors were originating from outside of Italy. When Diocletian introduced his reforms, this had the effect of the Roman Senate formally lost its already declining imperial influence and became a de facto regional body of decision-making. 

An early instance of the partition of the empire into East and West occurred in 286, when Emperor Diocletian appointed Maximian as augustus of the West. In 293 AD, the empire went through a devolution under Diocletian known as the Tetrarchy. The empire was split into four, with the two most prominent parts of the empire each ruled by one emperor (Augustus). Each co-emperor then appointed a young colleague as caesar to be a subordinate emperor with control over his own territory. The Caesar shared power with and would eventually succeed the senior partner. Each tetrarch was in charge of a part of the empire, with the divisions based on geographic regions. This devolution outlines the coming split 100 years later when the empire was permanently divided into an eastern and western empire. The tetrarchy however only lasted 20 years, as emperors quickly began fighting each other for power. The whole empire was eventually reunited by Constantine the Great in 324 after he ended the last of these civil wars.

Christianisation and partition of the empire 

In 330, Constantine moved the seat of the empire to Constantinople, which he founded as a second Rome on the site of Byzantium, a city strategically located on the trade routes between Europe and Asia and between the Mediterranean and the Black Sea. Constantine introduced substantial changes to the empire's military, monetary, civil and religious institutions. In regards to his economic policies he has been accused by certain scholars of "reckless fiscality", but the gold solidus he introduced became a stable currency that transformed the economy and promoted development.

Under Constantine, Christianity did not become the exclusive religion of the state but enjoyed imperial preference since he supported it with generous privileges. Constantine established the principle that emperors could not settle questions of doctrine on their own but should instead summon general ecclesiastical councils for that purpose. His convening of both the Synod of Arles and the First Council of Nicaea indicated his interest in the unity of the Church and showcased his claim to be its head. The rise of Christianity was briefly interrupted on the accession of the emperor Julian in 361, who made a determined effort to restore polytheism throughout the empire and was thus dubbed "Julian the Apostate" by the Church. However, this was reversed when Julian was killed in battle in 363.

Theodosius I (379–395) was the last emperor to rule both the Eastern and Western halves of the empire. In 391 and 392 he issued a series of edicts essentially banning pagan religion. Pagan festivals and sacrifices were banned, as was access to all pagan temples and places of worship. The last Olympic Games are believed to have been held in 393. In 395, Theodosius I bequeathed the imperial office jointly to his sons: Arcadius in the East and Honorius in the West, once again dividing imperial administration. In the 5th century, the Eastern part of the empire was largely spared the difficulties faced by the West—due in part to a more established urban culture and greater financial resources, which allowed it to placate invaders with tribute and pay foreign mercenaries. This success allowed Theodosius II to focus on codifying Roman law with the Codex Theodosianus and further fortification of the walls of Constantinople, which left the city impervious to most attacks until 1204.

To fend off the Huns, Theodosius had to pay an enormous annual tribute to Attila. His successor, Marcian, refused to continue to pay the tribute, but Attila had already diverted his attention to the Western Roman Empire. After Attila's death in 453, the Hun Empire collapsed, and many of the remaining Huns were often hired as mercenaries by Constantinople.

Loss of the Western Roman Empire 
After the fall of Attila, the Eastern Empire enjoyed a period of peace, while the Western Empire continued to deteriorate with the expanding migration and invasions of the barbarians, most prominently the Germanic nations. The West's end is usually dated 476 when the East Germanic Roman foederati general Odoacer deposed the Western Emperor Romulus Augustulus, a year after the latter usurped the position from Julius Nepos. In 480 with the death of Nepos, Eastern Emperor Zeno became sole claimant to emperor of the empire. Odoacer became King of Italy and was nominally Zeno's subordinate but acted with complete autonomy, eventually providing support to a rebellion against the emperor.

Zeno negotiated with the invading Ostrogoths, who had settled in Moesia, convincing the Gothic king Theodoric to depart for Italy as magister militum per Italiam ("commander in chief for Italy") to depose Odoacer. By urging Theodoric to conquer Italy, Zeno rid the Eastern Empire of an unruly subordinate (Odoacer) and moved another (Theodoric) further from the heart of the empire. After Odoacer's defeat in 493, Theodoric ruled Italy de facto, although he was never recognised by the eastern emperors as "king" (rex).

In 491, Anastasius I, an aged civil officer of Roman origin, became emperor, but it was not until 497 that the forces of Anastasius effectively took the measure of Isaurian resistance. Anastasius revealed himself as an energetic reformer and an able administrator. He introduced a new coinage system of the copper follis, the coin used in most everyday transactions. He also reformed the tax system and permanently abolished the chrysargyron tax.

Justinian dynasty

The rise of Justinian I 
The Justinian dynasty was founded by Justin I, who though illiterate, rose through the ranks of the Byzantine army to become emperor in 518. He was succeeded by his nephew Justinian I in 527, who may already have exerted effective control during Justin's reign. One of the most important figures of late antiquity and possibly the last Roman emperor to speak Latin as a first language, Justinian's rule constitutes a distinct epoch, marked by the ambitious but only partly realised renovatio imperii, or "restoration of the empire". Justinian's wife Theodora was particularly influential.

In 529, Justinian appointed a ten-man commission chaired by John the Cappadocian to revise Roman law and create a new codification of laws and jurists' extracts, known as the "Corpus Juris Civilis", or the Justinian Code. In 534, the Corpus was updated and, along with the enactments promulgated by Justinian after 534, formed the system of law used for most of the rest of the Byzantine era. The Corpus forms the basis of civil law of many modern states.

Renovatio imperii and the wars of Justinian 
In 532, attempting to secure his eastern frontier, Justinian signed a peace treaty with Khosrau I of Persia, agreeing to pay a large annual tribute to the Sassanids. In the same year, he survived a revolt in Constantinople (the Nika riots), which solidified his power but ended with the deaths of a reported 30,000 to 35,000 rioters on his orders. The western conquests began in 533, as Justinian sent his general Belisarius to reclaim the former province of Africa from the Vandals, who had been in control since 429 with their capital at Carthage. Success in the war came with surprising ease, but it was not until 548 that the major local tribes were subdued.

In 535, a small Byzantine expedition to Sicily met with easy success, but the Goths stiffened their resistance, and victory did not come until 540 when Belisarius captured Ravenna, after successful sieges of Naples and Rome. In 535–536, Ostrogoth King Theodahad sent Pope Agapetus I to Constantinople to request the removal of Byzantine forces from Sicily, Dalmatia, and Italy. Although Agapetus failed in his mission to sign a peace with Justinian, he succeeded in having the monophysite Patriarch Anthimus I denounced at the Council of Constantinople, despite Empress Theodora's support and protection.

The Ostrogoths captured Rome in 546. Belisarius, who had been sent back to Italy in 544, was eventually recalled to Constantinople in 549. The arrival of the Armenian eunuch Narses in Italy (late 551) with an army of 35,000 men marked another shift in Gothic fortunes. Ostrogoth King Totila was defeated at the Battle of Taginae, and his successor Teia was defeated at the Battle of Mons Lactarius in October 552. Despite continuing resistance from a few Gothic garrisons and two subsequent invasions by the Franks and Alemanni, the war for the Italian peninsula was at an end. In 551, Athanagild, a noble from Visigothic Hispania, sought Justinian's help in a rebellion against the king, and the emperor dispatched a force under Liberius, a successful military commander. The empire held on to a small slice of the Iberian Peninsula coast until the reign of Heraclius.

In the east, the Roman–Persian Wars continued until 561 when the envoys of Justinian and Khosrau agreed on a 50-year peace. By the mid-550s, Justinian had won victories in most theatres of operation, with the notable exception of the Balkans, which were subjected to repeated incursions from the Slavs and the Gepids. Tribes of Serbs and Croats were later resettled in the northwestern Balkans, during the reign of Heraclius. Justinian called Belisarius out of retirement and defeated the new Hunnish threat. The strengthening of the Danube fleet caused the Kutrigur Huns to withdraw, and they agreed to a treaty that allowed safe passage back across the Danube.

Transition into an eastern Christian empire

Although polytheism had been suppressed by the state since at least the time of Theodosius I in the 4th century, traditional Greco-Roman culture was still influential in the Eastern empire in the 6th century. Hellenistic philosophy began to be gradually amalgamated into newer Christian philosophy. Philosophers such as John Philoponus drew on neoplatonic ideas in addition to Christian thought and empiricism. Because of the active paganism of its professors, Justinian closed down the Neoplatonic Academy in 529. Other schools continued in Constantinople, Antioch and Alexandria, which were the centres of Justinian's empire. Hymns written by Romanos the Melodist marked the development of the Divine Liturgy, while the architects Isidore of Miletus and Anthemius of Tralles worked to complete the Church of the Holy Wisdom, Hagia Sophia, which was designed to replace an older church destroyed during the Nika Revolt. Completed in 537, the Hagia Sophia stands today as one of the major monuments of Byzantine architectural history. During the 6th and 7th centuries, the empire was struck by a series of epidemics, which devastated the population and contributed to a significant economic decline and a weakening of the empire. Great bathhouses were built in Byzantine centres such as Constantinople and Antioch.

Decline of the Justinian dynasty
After Justinian died in 565, his successor, Justin II, refused to pay the large tribute to the Persians. Meanwhile, the Germanic Lombards invaded Italy; by the end of the century, only a third of Italy was in Byzantine hands. Justin II's successor, Tiberius II, choosing between his enemies, awarded subsidies to the Avars while taking military action against the Persians. Although Tiberius' general, Maurice, led an effective campaign on the eastern frontier, subsidies failed to restrain the Avars, who captured the Balkan fortress of Sirmium in 582, while the Slavs began to make inroads across the Danube.

Maurice succeeded Tiberius and intervened in a Persian civil war, placing the legitimate Khosrau II back on the throne, and married his daughter to him. Maurice's treaty with his son-in-law enlarged the territories of the empire to the East and allowed the energetic emperor to focus on the Balkans. By 602, a series of successful Byzantine campaigns had pushed the Avars and Slavs back across the Danube. However, Maurice's refusal to ransom several thousand captives taken by the Avars, and his order to the troops to winter in the Danube, caused his popularity to plummet. A revolt broke out under an officer named Phocas, who marched the troops back to Constantinople; Maurice and his family were murdered while trying to escape.

Arab invasions and shrinking borders

Early Heraclian dynasty 

After Maurice's murder by Phocas, Khosrau used the pretext to reconquer the Roman province of Mesopotamia. Phocas, an unpopular ruler invariably described in Byzantine sources as a "tyrant", was the target of a number of Senate-led plots. He was eventually deposed in 610 by Heraclius, who sailed to Constantinople from Carthage with an icon affixed to the prow of his ship.

Following the accession of Heraclius, the Sassanid advance pushed deep into the Levant, occupying Damascus and Jerusalem and removing the True Cross to Ctesiphon. The counter-attack launched by Heraclius took on the character of a holy war, and an acheiropoieton image of Christ was carried as a military standard (similarly, when Constantinople was saved from a combined Avar–Sassanid–Slavic siege in 626, the victory was attributed to the icons of the Virgin that were led in procession by Patriarch Sergius about the walls of the city). The combined forces unsuccessfully besieged the capital between June and July. After this, the Sassanid army was forced to withdraw to Anatolia. The loss came just after news had reached them of yet another Byzantine victory, where Heraclius's brother Theodore heavily defeated the Persian general Shahin. Following this, Heraclius led an invasion into Sassanid Mesopotamia once again.

The main Sassanid force was destroyed at Nineveh in 627, and in 629 Heraclius restored the True Cross to Jerusalem in a majestic ceremony, as he marched into the Sassanid capital of Ctesiphon, where anarchy and civil war reigned as a result of the enduring war. The war had exhausted both the Byzantines and Sassanids, however, and left them extremely vulnerable to the Muslim forces that emerged in the following years. The Byzantines suffered a crushing defeat by the Arabs at the Battle of Yarmouk in 636, while Ctesiphon fell to the Rashidun Caliphate in 637.

First Arab siege of Constantinople (674–678) and the theme system 

The Arabs, firmly in control of Syria and the Levant, sent frequent raiding parties deep into Asia Minor, and in 674–678 laid siege to Constantinople. The Arab fleet was finally repulsed through the use of Greek fire, and a thirty-years' truce was signed between the empire and the Umayyad Caliphate. However, the Anatolian raids continued unabated and accelerated the demise of classical urban culture, with the inhabitants of many cities either refortifying much smaller areas within the old city walls or relocating entirely to nearby fortresses. Constantinople shrank substantially from 500,000 inhabitants to just 40,000–70,000, and, like other urban centres, it was partly ruralised. The city also lost the free grain shipments in 618, after Egypt fell first to the Persians and then to the Arabs, and public wheat distribution ceased.

The void left by the disappearance of the old semi-autonomous civic institutions was filled by the system called theme, which entailed dividing Asia Minor into "provinces" occupied by distinct armies that assumed civil authority and answered directly to the imperial administration. This system may have had its roots in certain ad hoc measures taken by Heraclius, but over the course of the 7th century it developed into an entirely new system of imperial governance. The massive cultural and institutional restructuring of the empire consequent on the loss of territory in the 7th century has been said to have caused a decisive break in east Mediterranean Romanness, and that the Byzantine state is subsequently best understood as another successor state rather than a real continuation of the Roman Empire.

Late Heraclian dynasty 

The withdrawal of large numbers of troops from the Balkans to combat the Persians and then the Arabs in the east opened the door for the gradual southward expansion of Slavic peoples into the peninsula, and, as in Asia Minor, many cities shrank to small fortified settlements. In the 670s, the Bulgars were pushed south of the Danube by the arrival of the Khazars. In 680, Byzantine forces sent to disperse these new settlements were defeated.

In 681, Constantine IV signed a treaty with the Bulgar Khan Asparukh, and the new Bulgarian state assumed sovereignty over several Slavic tribes that had previously, at least in name, recognised Byzantine rule. In 687–688, the final Heraclian emperor, Justinian II, led an expedition against the Slavs and Bulgarians and made significant gains, although the fact that he had to fight his way from Thrace to Macedonia demonstrates the degree to which Byzantine power in the north Balkans had declined.

Justinian II attempted to break the power of the urban aristocracy through severe taxation and the appointment of "outsiders" to administrative posts. He was driven from power in 695 and took shelter first with the Khazars and then with the Bulgarians. In 705, he returned to Constantinople with the armies of the Bulgarian Khan Tervel, retook the throne and instituted a reign of terror against his enemies. With his final overthrow in 711, supported once more by the urban aristocracy, the Heraclian dynasty came to an end.

Second Arab siege of Constantinople (717–718) and the Isaurian dynasty 

In 717 the Umayyad Caliphate launched a siege on Constantinople which lasted for one year. However, the combination of Leo III the Isaurian's military genius, the Byzantines' use of Greek fire, a cold winter in 717–718, and Byzantine diplomacy with the Khan Tervel of Bulgaria resulted in a Byzantine victory. After Leo III turned back the Muslim assault in 718, he addressed himself to the task of reorganising and consolidating the themes in Asia Minor. In 740 a major Byzantine victory took place at the Battle of Akroinon where the Byzantines destroyed the Umayyad army.

Constantine V won noteworthy victories in northern Syria and also thoroughly undermined Bulgarian strength. In 746, profiting by the unstable conditions in the Umayyad Caliphate, which was falling apart under Marwan II, Constantine V invaded Syria and captured Germanikeia, and the Battle of Keramaia resulted in a major Byzantine naval victory over the Umayyad fleet. Coupled with military defeats on other fronts of the caliphate and internal instability, Umayyad expansion came to an end.

Religious dispute over iconoclasm 

The 8th and early 9th centuries were also dominated by controversy and religious division over Iconoclasm, which was the main political issue in the empire for over a century. Icons (here meaning all forms of religious imagery) were banned by Leo and Constantine from around 730, leading to revolts by iconodules (supporters of icons) throughout the empire. After the efforts of Empress Irene, the Second Council of Nicaea met in 787 and affirmed that icons could be venerated but not worshipped. Irene is said to have endeavoured to negotiate a marriage between herself and Charlemagne, but according to Theophanes the Confessor the scheme was frustrated by Aetios, one of her advisors.

In the early 9th century, Leo V reintroduced the policy of iconoclasm, but in 843 Empress Theodora restored the veneration of icons with the help of Patriarch Methodios. Iconoclasm played a part in the further alienation of East from West, which worsened during the so-called Photian schism when Pope Nicholas I challenged the elevation of Photios to the patriarchate.

Macedonian dynasty and resurgence (867–1025) 

The accession of Basil I to the throne in 867 marks the beginning of the Macedonian dynasty, which ruled for 150 years. This dynasty included some of the ablest emperors in Byzantium's history, and the period is one of revival. The empire moved from defending against external enemies to reconquest of territories. The Macedonian dynasty was characterised by a cultural revival in spheres such as philosophy and the arts. There was a conscious effort to restore the brilliance of the period before the Slavic and subsequent Arab invasions, and the Macedonian era has been dubbed the "Golden Age" of Byzantium. Although the empire was significantly smaller than during the reign of Justinian I, it had regained much strength, as the remaining territories were less geographically dispersed and more politically, economically, and culturally integrated.

Wars against the Abbasids 

Taking advantage of the empire's weakness after the Revolt of Thomas the Slav in the early 820s, the Arabs re-emerged and captured Crete. They also successfully attacked Sicily, but in 863 general Petronas gained a decisive victory at the Battle of Lalakaon against Umar al-Aqta, the emir of Melitene (Malatya). Under the leadership of Emperor Krum, the Bulgarian threat also re-emerged, but in 815–816 Krum's son, Omurtag, signed a peace treaty with Leo V.

In the 830s the Abbasid Caliphate started military excursions culminating with a victory in the Sack of Amorium. The Byzantines then counter-attacked and sacked Damietta in Egypt. Later the Abbasid Caliphate responded by sending their troops into Anatolia again, sacking and marauding until they were eventually annihilated by the Byzantines at the Battle of Lalakaon in 863.

In the early years of Basil I's reign, Arab raids on the coasts of Dalmatia and the siege of Ragusa (866–868) were defeated, and the region once again came under secure Byzantine control. This enabled Byzantine missionaries to penetrate to the interior and convert the Serbs and the principalities of modern-day Herzegovina and Montenegro to Christianity.

By contrast, the Byzantine position in Southern Italy was gradually consolidated; by 873 Bari was once again under Byzantine rule, and most of Southern Italy remained in the empire for the next 200 years. On the more important eastern front, the empire rebuilt its defences and went on the offensive. The Paulicians were defeated at the Battle of Bathys Ryax and their capital of Tephrike (Divrigi) taken, while the offensive against the Abbasid Caliphate began with the recapture of Samosata.

Under Basil's son and successor, Leo VI the Wise, the gains in the east against the enfeebled Abbasid Caliphate continued. Sicily was lost to the Arabs in 902, and in 904 Thessaloniki, the empire's second city, was sacked by an Arab fleet. The naval weakness of the empire was rectified. Despite this revenge, the Byzantines were still unable to strike a decisive blow against the Muslims, who inflicted a crushing defeat on the imperial forces when they attempted to regain Crete in 911.

The death of the Bulgarian Emperor Simeon I in 927 severely weakened the Bulgarians, allowing the Byzantines to concentrate on the eastern front. Melitene was permanently recaptured in 934, and in 943 the famous general John Kourkouas continued the offensive in Mesopotamia with some noteworthy victories, culminating in the reconquest of Edessa. Kourkouas was especially celebrated for returning to Constantinople the venerated Mandylion, a relic purportedly imprinted with a portrait of Jesus.

The soldier-emperors Nikephoros II Phokas and John I Tzimiskes (969–976) expanded the empire well into Syria, defeating the emirs of northwest Iraq. Nikephoros took Aleppo in 962, and the Arabs were decisively expelled from Crete in 963. The recapture of Crete in the siege of Chandax put an end to Arab raids in the Aegean, allowing mainland Greece to flourish again. Cyprus was permanently retaken in 965, and the successes of Nikephoros culminated in 969 with the siege of Antioch and its recapture, which he incorporated as a province of the empire. His successor John Tzimiskes recaptured Damascus, Beirut, Acre, Sidon, Caesarea and Tiberias, putting Byzantine armies within striking distance of Jerusalem, although the Muslim power centres in Iraq and Egypt were left untouched. After much campaigning in the north, the last Arab threat to Byzantium, the rich province of Sicily, was targeted in 1025 by Basil II, who died before the expedition could be completed. By that time the empire stretched from the straits of Messina to the Euphrates and from the Danube to Syria.

Wars against the Bulgarian Empire 

The traditional struggle with the See of Rome continued through the Macedonian period, spurred by the question of religious supremacy over the newly Christianised state of Bulgaria. Ending eighty years of peace between the two states, the powerful Bulgarian Tsar Simeon I invaded in 894 but was pushed back by the Byzantines, who used their fleet to sail up the Black Sea to attack the Bulgarian rear, enlisting the support of the Hungarians. The Byzantines were defeated at the Battle of Boulgarophygon in 896, however, and agreed to pay annual subsidies to the Bulgarians.

Leo the Wise died in 912, and hostilities resumed as Simeon marched to Constantinople at the head of a large army. Although the walls of the city were impregnable, the Byzantine administration was in disarray and Simeon was invited into the city, where he was granted the crown of basileus (emperor) of Bulgaria and had the young Emperor Constantine VII marry one of his daughters. When a revolt in Constantinople halted his dynastic project, he again invaded Thrace and conquered Adrianople. The empire now faced the problem of a powerful Christian state within a few days' marching distance from Constantinople, as well as having to fight on two fronts.

A great imperial expedition under Leo Phocas and Romanos I Lekapenos ended with another crushing Byzantine defeat at the Battle of Achelous in 917, and the following year the Bulgarians were free to ravage northern Greece. Adrianople was plundered again in 923, and a Bulgarian army laid siege to Constantinople in 924. Simeon died suddenly in 927, however, and Bulgarian power collapsed with him. Bulgaria and Byzantium entered a long period of peaceful relations, and the empire was free to concentrate on the eastern front against the Muslims. In 968, Bulgaria was overrun by the Rus' under Sviatoslav I, but three years later, John I Tzimiskes defeated the Rus' and re-incorporated eastern Bulgaria into the Byzantine Empire.

Bulgarian resistance revived under the rule of the Cometopuli dynasty, but Emperor Basil II made the submission of the Bulgarians his primary goal. Basil's first expedition against Bulgaria, however, resulted in a defeat at the Gates of Trajan. For the next few years, the emperor was preoccupied with internal revolts in Anatolia, while the Bulgarians expanded their realm in the Balkans. The war dragged on for nearly twenty years. The Byzantine victories of Spercheios and Skopje decisively weakened the Bulgarian army, and in annual campaigns Basil methodically reduced the Bulgarian strongholds. At the Battle of Kleidion in 1014 the Bulgarians were annihilated: their army was captured, and it is said that 99 out of every 100 men were blinded, with the hundredth man left with one eye so he could lead his compatriots home. When Tsar Samuil saw the broken remains of his once formidable army, he died of shock. By 1018, the last Bulgarian strongholds had surrendered, and the country became part of the empire. This victory restored the Danube frontier, which had not been held since the days of the Emperor Heraclius.

Relations with the Kievan Rus' 

Between 850 and 1100, the empire developed a mixed relationship with the Kievan Rus', which had emerged to the north across the Black Sea. This relationship had long-lasting repercussions in the history of the East Slavs, and the empire quickly became the main trading and cultural partner for Kiev. The Rus' launched their first attack against Constantinople in 860, pillaging the suburbs of the city. In 941, they appeared on the Asian shore of the Bosphorus, but this time they were crushed, an indication of the improvements in the Byzantine military position after 907, when only diplomacy had been able to push back the invaders. Basil II could not ignore the emerging power of the Rus', and following the example of his predecessors he used religion as a means for achieving political purposes. Rus'–Byzantine relations became closer following the marriage of Anna Porphyrogeneta to Vladimir the Great in 988, and the subsequent Christianisation of the Rus'. Byzantine priests, architects, and artists were invited to work on numerous cathedrals and churches around Rus', expanding Byzantine cultural influence even further, while numerous Rus' served in the Byzantine army as mercenaries, most notably as the famous Varangian Guard.

Even after the Christianisation of the Rus', however, relations were not always friendly. The most serious conflict between the two powers was an invasion of Bulgaria in 968, but several Rus' raiding expeditions against the Byzantine cities of the Black Sea coast and Constantinople are also recorded. Although most were repulsed, they were often followed by treaties that were generally favourable to the Rus', such as the one concluded at the end of the war of 1043, during which the Rus' indicated their ambitions to compete with the Byzantines as an independent power.

Campaigns in the Caucasus 

Between 1021 and 1022, following years of tensions, Basil II led a series of victorious campaigns against the Kingdom of Georgia, resulting in the annexation of several Georgian provinces to the empire. Basil's successors also annexed Bagratid Armenia in 1045. Importantly, both Georgia and Armenia were significantly weakened by the Byzantine administration's policy of heavy taxation and abolishing of the levy. The weakening of Georgia and Armenia played a significant role in the Byzantine defeat at Manzikert in 1071.

Apex 

Basil II is considered among the most capable Byzantine emperors and his reign as the apex of the empire in the Middle Ages. By 1025, the date of Basil II's death, the Byzantine Empire stretched from Armenia in the east to Calabria in southern Italy in the west. Many successes had been achieved, ranging from the conquest of Bulgaria to the annexation of parts of Georgia and Armenia, and the reconquests of Crete, Cyprus, and the important city of Antioch. These were not temporary tactical gains but long-term reconquests.

Leo VI achieved the complete codification of Byzantine law in Greek. This monumental work of 60 volumes became the foundation of all subsequent Byzantine law and is still studied today. Leo also reformed the administration of the empire, redrawing the borders of the administrative subdivisions (the themata, or "themes") and tidying up the system of ranks and privileges, as well as regulating the behaviour of the various trade guilds in Constantinople. Leo's reform did much to reduce the previous fragmentation of the empire, which henceforth had one centre of power, Constantinople. However, the increasing military success of the empire greatly enriched and gave the provincial nobility more power over the peasantry, who were essentially reduced to a state of serfdom.

Under the Macedonian emperors Constantinople flourished, becoming the largest and wealthiest city in Europe, with a population of approximately 400,000 in the 9th and 10th centuries. During this period, the Byzantine Empire employed a strong civil service staffed by competent aristocrats that oversaw the collection of taxes, domestic administration, and foreign policy. The Macedonian emperors also increased the empire's wealth by fostering trade with Western Europe, particularly through the sale of silk and metalwork.

Split between Orthodoxy and Catholicism (1054) 

The Macedonian period included events of momentous religious significance. The conversion of the Bulgarians, Serbs and Rus' to Orthodox Christianity drew the religious map of Europe which still resonates today. Cyril and Methodius, two Byzantine Greek brothers from Thessaloniki, contributed significantly to the Christianisation of the Slavs and in the process devised the Glagolitic alphabet, ancestor to the Cyrillic script.

In 1054, relations between the Eastern and Western traditions of the Chalcedonian Christian Church reached a terminal crisis. Although there was a formal declaration of institutional separation on 16 July, when three papal legates entered the Hagia Sophia during Divine Liturgy on a Saturday afternoon and placed a bull of excommunication on the altar, the so-called Great Schism was actually the culmination of centuries of gradual separation.

Crisis and fragmentation 
The Byzantine Empire fell into a period of difficulties, caused to a large extent by the undermining of the theme system and the neglect of the military. Nikephoros II, John Tzimiskes, and Basil II shifted the emphasis of the military divisions (tagmata) from a reactive, defence-oriented citizen army into an army of professional career soldiers, increasingly dependent on foreign mercenaries. Mercenaries were expensive, however, and as the threat of invasion receded in the 10th century, so did the need for maintaining large garrisons and expensive fortifications. Basil II left a burgeoning treasury upon his death, but he neglected to plan for his succession. None of his immediate successors had any particular military or political talent, and the imperial administration increasingly fell into the hands of the civil service. Incompetent efforts to revive the Byzantine economy resulted in severe inflation and a debased gold currency. The army was seen as both an unnecessary expense and a political threat. A number of standing local units were demobilised, further augmenting the army's dependence on mercenaries, who could be retained and dismissed on an as-needed basis.

At the same time, Byzantium was faced with new enemies. Its provinces in southern Italy were threatened by the Normans who arrived in Italy at the beginning of the 11th century. During a period of strife between Constantinople and Rome culminating in the East-West Schism of 1054, the Normans advanced slowly but steadily into Byzantine Italy. Reggio, the capital of the tagma of Calabria, was captured in 1060 by Robert Guiscard, followed by Otranto in 1068. Bari, the main Byzantine stronghold in Apulia, was besieged in August 1068 and fell in April 1071.

About 1053, Constantine IX disbanded what the historian John Skylitzes calls the "Iberian Army", which consisted of 50,000 men, and it was turned into a contemporary Drungary of the Watch. Two other knowledgeable contemporaries, the former officials Michael Attaleiates and Kekaumenos, agree with Skylitzes that by demobilising these soldiers Constantine did catastrophic harm to the empire's eastern defences. The emergency lent weight to the military aristocracy in Anatolia, who in 1068 secured the election of one of their own, Romanos Diogenes, as emperor. In the summer of 1071, Romanos undertook a massive eastern campaign to draw the Seljuks into a general engagement with the Byzantine army. At the Battle of Manzikert, Romanos suffered a surprise defeat by Sultan Alp Arslan and was captured. Alp Arslan treated him with respect and imposed no harsh terms on the Byzantines. In Constantinople, however, a coup put in power Michael Doukas, who soon faced the opposition of Nikephoros Bryennios and Nikephoros III Botaneiates. By 1081, the Seljuks had expanded their rule over virtually the entire Anatolian plateau from Armenia in the east to Bithynia in the west, and they had founded their capital at Nicaea, just  from Constantinople.

Komnenian dynasty and the Crusades 

After Manzikert, a partial recovery (referred to as the Komnenian restoration) was made possible by the Komnenian dynasty. During the Komnenian period from about 1081 to about 1185, the dynasty presided over a sustained, though ultimately incomplete, restoration of the military, territorial, economic, and political position of the Byzantine Empire. Although the Seljuk Turks occupied the heartland of the empire in Anatolia, most Byzantine military efforts during this period were directed against Western powers, particularly the Normans.

The empire under the Komnenoi played a key role in the history of the Crusades in the Holy Land, which Alexios I had helped bring about, while also exerting enormous cultural and political influence in Europe, the Near East, and the lands around the Mediterranean Sea under John and Manuel. Contact between Byzantium and the "Latin" West, including the Crusader states, increased significantly during the Komnenian period. Venetian and other Italian traders became resident in large numbers in Constantinople and the empire (there were an estimated 60,000 Latins in Constantinople alone, out of a population of three to four hundred thousand), and their presence together with the numerous Latin mercenaries who were employed by Manuel helped to spread Byzantine technology, art, literature and culture throughout the Latin West, while also leading to a flow of Western ideas and customs into the empire.

Alexios I and the First Crusade 

The Komnenoi attained power under Alexios I in 1081. From the outset of his reign, Alexios faced a formidable attack by the Normans under Guiscard and his son Bohemund of Taranto, who captured Dyrrhachium and Corfu and laid siege to Larissa in Thessaly. Guiscard's death in 1085 temporarily eased the Norman problem. The following year, the Seljuq sultan died, and the sultanate was split by internal rivalries. By his own efforts, Alexios defeated the Pechenegs, who were caught by surprise and annihilated at the Battle of Levounion on 28 April 1091.

Having achieved stability in the West, Alexios could turn his attention to the severe economic difficulties and the disintegration of the empire's traditional defences. However, he still did not have enough manpower to recover the lost territories in Asia Minor and to advance against the Seljuks. At the Council of Piacenza in 1095, envoys from Alexios spoke to Pope Urban II about the suffering of the Christians of the East and underscored that without help from the West they would continue to suffer under Muslim rule. Urban saw Alexios request as a dual opportunity to cement Western Europe and reunite the Eastern Orthodox Church with the Roman Catholic Church under his rule. On 27 November 1095, Urban called the Council of Clermont and urged all those present to take up arms under the sign of the Cross and launch an armed pilgrimage to recover Jerusalem and the East from the Muslims. The response in Western Europe was overwhelming.

Alexios had anticipated help in the form of mercenary forces from the West, but he was totally unprepared for the immense and undisciplined force that arrived in Byzantine territory. It was no comfort to Alexios to learn that four of the eight leaders of the main body of the Crusade were Normans, among them Bohemund. Since the crusade had to pass through Constantinople, however, the emperor had some control over it. He required its leaders to swear to restore to the empire any towns or territories they might reconquer from the Turks on their way to the Holy Land. In return, he gave them guides and a military escort. Alexios was able to recover a number of important cities, islands and much of western Asia Minor. The Crusaders agreed to become Alexios' vassals under the Treaty of Devol in 1108, which marked the end of the Norman threat during Alexios' reign.

John II, Manuel I and the Second Crusade 

Alexios's son John II Komnenos succeeded him in 1118 and ruled until 1143. John was a pious and dedicated emperor who was determined to undo the damage to the empire suffered at the Battle of Manzikert half a century earlier. Famed for his piety and his remarkably mild and just reign, John was an exceptional example of a moral ruler at a time when cruelty was the norm. For this reason, he has been called the Byzantine Marcus Aurelius. During his twenty-five-year reign, John made alliances with the Holy Roman Empire in the West and decisively defeated the Pechenegs at the Battle of Beroia. He thwarted Hungarian and Serbian threats during the 1120s, and in 1130 he allied himself with German Emperor Lothair III against Norman King Roger II of Sicily.

In the later part of his reign, John focused his activities on the East, personally leading numerous campaigns against the Turks in Asia Minor. His campaigns fundamentally altered the balance of power in the East, forcing the Turks onto the defensive, while restoring many towns, fortresses, and cities across the peninsula to the Byzantines. He defeated the Danishmend Emirate of Melitene and reconquered all of Cilicia, while forcing Raymond of Poitiers, Prince of Antioch, to recognise Byzantine suzerainty. In an effort to demonstrate the emperor's role as the leader of the Christian world, John marched into the Holy Land at the head of the combined forces of the empire and the Crusader states; yet despite his great vigour pressing the campaign, his hopes were disappointed by the treachery of his Crusader allies. In 1142, John returned to press his claims to Antioch, but he died in the spring of 1143 following a hunting accident.

John's chosen heir was his fourth son, Manuel I Komnenos, who campaigned aggressively against his neighbours both in the west and in the east. In Palestine, Manuel allied with the Crusader Kingdom of Jerusalem and sent a large fleet to participate in a combined invasion of Fatimid Egypt. Manuel reinforced his position as overlord of the Crusader states, with his hegemony over Antioch and Jerusalem secured by agreement with Raynald, Prince of Antioch, and Amalric of Jerusalem. In an effort to restore Byzantine control over the ports of southern Italy, he sent an expedition to Italy in 1155, but disputes within the coalition led to the eventual failure of the campaign. Despite this military setback, Manuel's armies successfully invaded the southern parts of the Kingdom of Hungary in 1167, defeating the Hungarians at the Battle of Sirmium. By 1168, nearly the whole of the eastern Adriatic coast lay in Manuel's hands. Manuel made several alliances with the pope and Western Christian kingdoms, and he successfully handled the passage of the crusaders through his empire.

In the East, however, Manuel suffered a major defeat in 1176 at the Battle of Myriokephalon against the Turks. Yet the losses were quickly recovered, and in the following year Manuel's forces inflicted a defeat upon a force of "picked Turks". The Byzantine commander John Vatatzes, who destroyed the Turkish invaders at the Battle of Hyelion and Leimocheir, brought troops from the capital and was able to gather an army along the way, a sign that the Byzantine army remained strong and that the defensive programme of western Asia Minor was still successful.

12th-century Renaissance 

John and Manuel pursued active military policies, and both deployed considerable resources on sieges and city defences; aggressive fortification policies were at the heart of their imperial military policies. Despite the defeat at Myriokephalon, the policies of Alexios, John and Manuel resulted in vast territorial gains, increased frontier stability in Asia Minor, and secured the stabilisation of the empire's European frontiers. From c. 1081 to c. 1180, the Komnenian army assured the empire's security, enabling Byzantine civilisation to flourish.

This allowed the Western provinces to achieve an economic revival that continued until the close of the century. It has been argued that Byzantium under the Komnenian rule was more prosperous than at any time since the Persian invasions of the 7th century. During the 12th century, population levels rose and extensive tracts of new agricultural land were brought into production. Archaeological evidence from both Europe and Asia Minor shows a considerable increase in the size of urban settlements, together with a notable upsurge in new towns. Trade was also flourishing; the Venetians, the Genoese and others opened up the ports of the Aegean to commerce, shipping goods from the Crusader states and Fatimid Egypt to the west and trading with the empire via Constantinople.

In artistic terms, there was a revival in mosaic, and regional schools of architecture began producing many distinctive styles that drew on a range of cultural influences. During the 12th century, the Byzantines provided their model of early humanism as a renaissance of interest in classical authors. In Eustathius of Thessalonica, Byzantine humanism found its most characteristic expression. In philosophy, there was a resurgence of classical learning not seen since the 7th century, characterised by a significant increase in the publication of commentaries on classical works. Besides, the first transmission of classical Greek knowledge to the West occurred during the Komnenian period. In terms of prosperity and cultural life, the Komnenian period was one of the peaks in Byzantine history, and Constantinople remained the leading city of the Christian world in size, wealth, and culture. There was a renewed interest in classical Greek philosophy, as well as an increase in literary output in vernacular Greek. Byzantine art and literature held a pre-eminent place in Europe, and the cultural impact of Byzantine art on the West during this period was enormous and of long-lasting significance.

Decline and disintegration

Angelid dynasty 

Manuel's death on 24 September 1180 left his 11-year-old son Alexios II Komnenos on the throne. Alexios was highly incompetent in the office, and with his mother Maria of Antioch's Frankish background, his regency was unpopular. Eventually, Andronikos I Komnenos, a grandson of Alexios I, launched a revolt against his younger relative and managed to overthrow him in a violent coup d'état. Utilising his good looks and his immense popularity with the army, Andronikos marched to Constantinople in August 1182 and incited a massacre of the Latins. After eliminating his potential rivals, he had himself crowned as co-emperor in September 1183. He eliminated Alexios II and took his 12-year-old wife Agnes of France for himself.

Andronikos began his reign well; in particular, the measures he took to reform the government of the empire have been praised by historians. According to George Ostrogorsky, Andronikos was determined to root out corruption: under his rule, the sale of offices ceased; selection was based on merit, rather than favouritism; officials were paid an adequate salary to reduce the temptation of bribery. In the provinces, Andronikos's reforms produced a speedy and marked improvement. The aristocrats were infuriated against him, and to make matters worse, Andronikos seems to have become increasingly unbalanced; executions and violence became increasingly common, and his reign turned into a reign of terror. Andronikos seemed almost to seek the extermination of the aristocracy as a whole. The struggle against the aristocracy turned into wholesale slaughter, while the emperor resorted to ever more ruthless measures to shore up his regime.

Despite his military background, Andronikos failed to deal with Isaac Komnenos, Béla III of Hungary who reincorporated Croatian territories into Hungary, and Stephen Nemanja of Serbia who declared his independence from the Byzantine Empire. Yet, none of these troubles would compare to William II of Sicily's invasion force of 300 ships and 80,000 men, arriving in 1185 and sacking Thessalonica. Andronikos mobilised a small fleet of 100 ships to defend the capital, but other than that he was indifferent to the populace. He was finally overthrown when Isaac II Angelos, surviving an imperial assassination attempt, seized power with the aid of the people and had Andronikos killed.

The reign of Isaac II, and more so that of his brother Alexios III, saw the collapse of what remained of the centralised machinery of Byzantine government and defence. Although the Normans were driven out of Greece, in 1186 the Vlachs and Bulgars began a rebellion that led to the formation of the Second Bulgarian Empire. The internal policy of the Angeloi was characterised by the squandering of the public treasure and fiscal maladministration. Imperial authority was severely weakened, and the growing power vacuum at the centre of the empire encouraged fragmentation. There is evidence that some Komnenian heirs had set up a semi-independent state in Trebizond before 1204. According to Alexander Vasiliev, "the dynasty of the Angeloi, Greek in its origin, ... accelerated the ruin of the Empire, already weakened without and disunited within."

Fourth Crusade 

In 1198, Pope Innocent III broached the subject of a new crusade through legates and encyclical letters. The stated intent of the crusade was to conquer Egypt, the centre of Muslim power in the Levant. The crusader army arrived at Venice in the summer of 1202 and hired the Venetian fleet to transport them to Egypt. As a payment to the Venetians, they captured the (Christian) port of Zara in Dalmatia (vassal city of Venice, which had rebelled and placed itself under Hungary's protection in 1186). Shortly afterwards, Alexios IV Angelos, son of the deposed and blinded Emperor Isaac II, made contacts with the crusaders. Alexios offered to reunite the Byzantine church with Rome, pay the crusaders 200,000 silver marks, join the crusade, and provide all the supplies they needed to reach Egypt.

Crusader sack of Constantinople (1204) 

The crusaders arrived at Constantinople in the summer of 1203 and quickly attacked, starting a major fire that damaged large parts of the city, and briefly seized control. Alexios III fled from the capital, and Alexios Angelos was elevated to the throne as Alexios IV along with his blind father Isaac. Alexios IV and Isaac II were unable to keep their promises and were deposed by Alexios V. The crusaders again took the city on 13 April 1204, and Constantinople was subjected to pillage and massacre by the rank and file for three days. Many priceless icons, relics and other objects later turned up in Western Europe, a large number in Venice. According to chronicler Niketas Choniates, a prostitute was even set up on the patriarchal throne. When order had been restored, the crusaders and the Venetians proceeded to implement their agreement; Baldwin of Flanders was elected emperor of a new Latin Empire, and the Venetian Thomas Morosini was chosen as patriarch. The lands divided up among the leaders included most of the former Byzantine possessions. Although Venice was more interested in commerce than conquering territory, it took key areas of Constantinople, and the Doge took the title of "Lord of a Quarter and Half a Quarter of the Roman Empire".

Empire in exile 

After the sack of Constantinople in 1204 by Latin crusaders, two Byzantine successor states were established: the Empire of Nicaea and the Despotate of Epirus. A third, the Empire of Trebizond, was created after Alexios Komnenos, commanding the Georgian expedition in Chaldia a few weeks before the sack of Constantinople, found himself de facto emperor and established himself in Trebizond. Of the three successor states, Epirus and Nicaea stood the best chance of reclaiming Constantinople. The Nicaean Empire struggled to survive the next few decades, however, and by the mid-13th century it had lost much of southern Anatolia. The weakening of the Sultanate of Rûm following the Mongol invasion in 1242–1243 allowed many beyliks and ghazis to set up their own principalities in Anatolia, weakening the Byzantine hold on Asia Minor. In time, one of the Beys, Osman I, created the Ottoman Empire that would eventually conquer Constantinople. However, the Mongol invasion also gave Nicaea a temporary respite from Seljuk attacks, allowing it to concentrate on the Latin Empire to its north.

Reconquest of Constantinople 

The Empire of Nicaea, founded by the Laskarid dynasty, managed to effect the recapture of Constantinople from the Latins in 1261 and defeat Epirus. This led to a short-lived revival of Byzantine fortunes under Michael VIII Palaiologos, but the war-ravaged empire was ill-equipped to deal with the enemies that surrounded it. To maintain his campaigns against the Latins, Michael pulled troops from Asia Minor and levied crippling taxes on the peasantry, causing much resentment. Massive construction projects were completed in Constantinople to repair the damage of the Fourth Crusade, but none of these initiatives was of any comfort to the farmers in Asia Minor suffering raids from Muslim ghazis.

Rather than holding on to his possessions in Asia Minor, Michael chose to expand the empire, gaining only short-term success. To avoid another sacking of the capital by the Latins, he forced the Church to submit to Rome, again a temporary solution for which the peasantry hated Michael and Constantinople. The efforts of Andronikos II and later his grandson Andronikos III marked Byzantium's last genuine attempts in restoring the glory of the empire. However, the use of mercenaries by Andronikos II often backfired, with the Catalan Company ravaging the countryside and increasing resentment towards Constantinople.

Fall

Rise of the Ottomans and fall of Constantinople 

The situation became worse for Byzantium during the civil wars after Andronikos III died. A six-year-long civil war devastated the empire, allowing the Serbian ruler Stefan Dušan to overrun most of the empire's remaining territory and establish a Serbian Empire. In 1354, an earthquake at Gallipoli devastated the fort, allowing the Ottomans (who were hired as mercenaries during the civil war by John VI Kantakouzenos) to establish themselves in Europe. By the time the Byzantine civil wars had ended, the Ottomans had defeated the Serbians and subjugated them as vassals. Following the Battle of Kosovo, much of the Balkans became dominated by the Ottomans.

The Byzantine emperors appealed to the West for help, but the pope would only consider sending aid in return for a reunion of the Eastern Orthodox Church with the See of Rome. Church unity was considered and occasionally accomplished by imperial decree, but the Orthodox citizenry and clergy intensely resented the authority of Rome and the Latin Rite. Some Western troops arrived to bolster the Christian defence of Constantinople, but most Western rulers, distracted by their own affairs, did nothing as the Ottomans picked apart the remaining Byzantine territories.

Constantinople by this stage was underpopulated and dilapidated. The population of the city had collapsed so severely that it was now little more than a cluster of villages separated by fields. On 2 April 1453, Sultan Mehmed's army of 80,000 men and large numbers of irregulars laid siege to the city. Despite a desperate last-ditch defence of the city by the massively outnumbered Christian forces (c. 7,000 men, 2,000 of whom were foreign), Constantinople finally fell to the Ottomans after a two-month siege on 29 May 1453. The final Byzantine emperor, Constantine XI Palaiologos, was last seen casting off his imperial regalia and throwing himself into hand-to-hand combat after the walls of the city were taken.

Political aftermath 

By the time of the fall of Constantinople, the Byzantine Empire, already an empire in name only since the Fourth Crusade, had been reduced to three rump states, which were the Despotate of the Morea, the Empire of Trebizond and the Principality of Theodoro. The Morea was ruled by the brothers of Constantine XI, Thomas Palaiologos and Demetrios Palaiologos. The despotate continued as an independent state by paying an annual tribute to the Ottomans. Incompetent rule, failure to pay the annual tribute, and a revolt against the Ottomans finally led to Mehmed II's invasion of Morea in May 1460.

A few holdouts remained for a time. The island of Monemvasia refused to surrender, and it was ruled for a short time by an Aragonese corsair. When the population drove him out they obtained the consent of Thomas to place themselves under the pope's protection before the end of 1460. The Mani Peninsula, on the Morea's south end, resisted under a loose coalition of the local clans and then that area came under Venice's rule. The last holdout was Salmeniko, in the Morea's northwest. Graitzas Palaiologos was the military commander there, stationed at Salmeniko Castle. While the town eventually surrendered, Graitzas and his garrison and some town residents held out in the castle until July 1461, when they escaped and reached Venetian territory.

The Empire of Trebizond, which had split away from the Byzantine Empire just weeks before Constantinople was taken by the Crusaders in 1204, became the last remnant and last de facto successor state to the Byzantine Empire. Efforts by Emperor David to recruit European powers for an anti-Ottoman crusade provoked war between the Ottomans and Trebizond in the summer of 1461. After a month-long siege, David surrendered the city of Trebizond on 14 August 1461. Trebizond's Crimean principality, the Principality of Theodoro (part of the Perateia), lasted another 14 years, falling to the Ottomans in December 1475. Therefore, the last remnant of the Roman Empire had officially ceased to exist, after 2,228 years of Roman civilization, since the legendary Founding of Rome in 753 BC.

A nephew of the last emperor, Constantine XI, Andreas Palaiologos claimed to have inherited the title of Byzantine emperor. He lived in the Morea until its fall in 1460, then escaped to Rome where he lived under the protection of the Papal States for the remainder of his life. Since the office of the emperor had never been technically hereditary, Andreas' claim would have been without merit under Byzantine law. However, the empire had vanished, and Western states generally followed the Roman-church-sanctioned principles of hereditary sovereignty. Seeking a life in the west, Andreas styled himself Imperator Constantinopolitanus ("Emperor of Constantinople"), and sold his succession rights to both Charles VIII of France and the Catholic Monarchs.

Constantine XI died without producing an heir, and had Constantinople not fallen he might have been succeeded by the sons of his deceased elder brother, who were taken into the palace service of Mehmed II after the fall of Constantinople. The oldest boy, renamed Has Murad, became a personal favorite of Mehmed and served as beylerbey (governor-general) of the Balkans. The younger son, renamed Mesih Pasha, became admiral of the Ottoman fleet and sanjak-bey (governor) of the Province of Gallipoli. He eventually served twice as grand vizier under Mehmed's son, Bayezid II.

Mehmed II and his successors continued to consider themselves heirs to the Roman Empire. They considered that they had shifted their religious basis as Constantine had done before, and they continued to refer to their conquered Eastern Roman inhabitants (Orthodox Christians) as Rûm. However, this claim gradually faded away, as the Ottoman Empire assumed a more Islamic political identity. Meanwhile, the Danubian Principalities (whose rulers also considered themselves the heirs of the Eastern Roman Emperors) harbored Orthodox refugees, including some Byzantine nobles.

At Constantine's death, the role of the emperor as a patron of Eastern Orthodoxy was claimed by Ivan III, Grand Prince of Muscovy. He had married Andreas' sister, Sophia Palaiologina, whose grandson, Ivan IV, would become the first tsar of Russia (tsar, or czar, meaning caesar, is a term traditionally applied by Slavs to the Byzantine emperors). Their successors supported the idea that Moscow was the proper heir to Rome and Constantinople. The idea of the Russian Empire as the successive Third Rome was kept alive until its demise with the Russian Revolution.

Government and bureaucracy 

As established by the Hellenistic political systems, the monarch was the sole and absolute ruler, and his power was regarded as having divine origin. From Justinian I on, the emperor was considered nomos empsychos, the "living law", both lawgiver and administrator. The senate had ceased to have real political and legislative authority but remained as an honorary council with titular members, resembling an emergency or ceremonial meeting made up of powerful Constantinopolitan aristocrats, very often friends and relatives of the emperor. By the end of the 8th century, a civil administration focused on the court was formed as part of a large-scale consolidation of power in the capital (the rise to pre-eminence of the position of sakellarios is related to this change). As a result of the different Orthodox and Hellenistic political philosophies, from Justinian onwards, an administrative simplification was given way for the emperor's easier management of the state as the sole administrator and lawgiver of the sacred Oikoumene. Definitive powers began to be attached around single entities who acted as viceroys, starting with the exarchs and their Justinianic-era predecessors stratelates who shared the extraordinary powers of the emperor in their respective districts and only answered to him, they also being appointed by the sovereign directly. The most important administrative reform, which probably started in the mid-7th century, was the creation of themes, where civil and military administration were embodied in a single person, the strategos, who, as the emperor's viceroy, shared his extraordinary powers in their respective "thémata", they too being also appointed by the emperor alone.

Despite the occasionally derogatory use of the terms "Byzantine" and "Byzantinism", the Byzantine bureaucracy had a distinct ability for adapting to the empire's changing situations. The elaborate system of titulature and precedence gave the court prestige and influence. Officials were arranged in strict order around the emperor and depended upon the royal will for their ranks. There were also actual administrative jobs, but authority could be vested in individuals rather than offices.

In the 8th and 9th centuries, civil service had constituted the clearest path to aristocratic status. However, beginning from the 9th century, the civil aristocracy was rivalled by an aristocracy of nobility. According to some studies of the Byzantine government, 11th-century politics were dominated by competition between the civil and the military aristocracy. During this period, Alexios I undertook important administrative reforms, including the creation of new courtly dignities and offices.

Diplomacy 

After the fall of Rome, the key challenge to the empire was maintaining relations with its neighbours. When these nations set about forging formal political institutions, they were often modelled after Constantinople. Byzantine diplomacy managed to draw its neighbours into a network of international and inter-state relations. This network revolved around treaty-making and included the welcoming of the new ruler into the family of kings and the assimilation of Byzantine social attitudes, values and institutions. Whereas classical writers are fond of making ethical and legal distinctions between peace and war, Byzantines regarded diplomacy as a form of war by other means. For example, a Bulgarian threat could be countered by providing money to the Kievan Rus'.

Diplomacy was understood to have an intelligence-gathering function on top of its pure political function. The Bureau of Barbarians in Constantinople handled matters of protocol and record-keeping for any issues related to the "barbarians", and thus had, perhaps, a basic intelligence function itself. John B. Bury believes that the office exercised supervision over all foreigners visiting Constantinople, and that they were under the supervision of the Logothetes tou dromou. While on the surface a protocol office—its main duty was to ensure foreign envoys were properly cared for and received sufficient state funds for their maintenance, and it kept all the official translators—it probably had a security function as well.

Byzantines availed themselves of several diplomatic practices. For example, embassies to the capital often stayed on for years. A member of other royal houses would routinely be requested to stay on in Constantinople as a potential hostage as well as a useful pawn in case political conditions changed. Another key practice was to overwhelm visitors by sumptuous displays. According to Dimitri Obolensky, the preservation of the ancient civilisation in Europe could be accredited to the skill and resourcefulness of Byzantine diplomacy, which remains one of Byzantium's lasting contributions to the history of Europe.

Law 

In 438, the Codex Theodosianus, named after Theodosius II, codified Byzantine law. It went into force in the Eastern Roman/Byzantine Empire as well as in the Western Roman Empire. It summarised the laws and gave direction on interpretation. Under the reign of Justinian I it was Tribonian, a notable jurist, who supervised the revision of the legal code known today as the Corpus Juris Civilis. Justinian's reforms had a clear effect on the evolution of jurisprudence, with his Corpus becoming the basis for revived Roman law in the Western world, while Leo III's Ecloga influenced the formation of legal institutions in the Slavic world. In the 10th century, Leo VI the Wise achieved the complete codification of the whole of Byzantine law in Greek with the Basilika, which became the foundation of all subsequent Byzantine law with an influence extending through to modern Balkan legal codes.

Science and medicine 

Byzantine science played an important and crucial role in the transmission of classical knowledge to the Islamic world and to Renaissance Italy. Many of the most distinguished classical scholars held high office in the Eastern Orthodox Church.

The Imperial University of Constantinople, sometimes known as the University of the Palace Hall of Magnaura, was an Eastern Roman educational institution that could trace its corporate origins to AD 425, when Emperor Theodosius II founded the Pandidakterion. The Pandidakterion was refounded in 1046 by Constantine IX Monomachos who created the Departments of Law (Διδασκαλεῖον τῶν Νόμων) and Philosophy (Γυμνάσιον). At the time various economic schools, colleges, polytechnics, libraries and fine arts academies also operated in the city of Constantinople. And a few scholars have gone so far as to call the Pandidakterion the first "university" in the world.

The writings of classical antiquity were cultivated and preserved in Byzantium. Therefore, Byzantine science was in every period closely connected with ancient philosophy, and metaphysics. In the field of engineering Isidore of Miletus, the Greek mathematician and architect of the Hagia Sophia, produced the first compilation of Archimedes' works c. 530, and it is through this manuscript tradition, kept alive by the school of mathematics and engineering founded c. 850 during the "Byzantine Renaissance" by Leo the Mathematician, that such works are known today (see Archimedes Palimpsest).

Alexandrian philosopher John Philoponus was the first to question Aristotelian physics. Unlike Aristotle, who based his physics on verbal argument, Philoponus relied on observation. Philoponus' criticism of Aristotelian principles of physics was an inspiration for Galileo Galilei's refutation of Aristotelian physics during the Scientific Revolution many centuries later, as Galileo cites Philoponus substantially in his works.

The Byzantines pioneered the concept of the hospital as an institution offering medical care and the possibility of a cure for the patients, as a reflection of the ideals of Christian charity, rather than merely a place to die.

Greek fire, an incendiary weapon which could even burn on water, is attributed to the Byzantines. It played a crucial role in the empire's victory over the Umayyad Caliphate during the siege of Constantinople (717–718). The discovery is attributed to Callinicus of Heliopolis from Syria who fled during the Arab conquest of Syria. However, it has also been argued that no single person invented Greek fire, but rather, that it was "invented by the chemists in Constantinople who had inherited the discoveries of the Alexandrian chemical school...".

In the final century of the empire, astronomy and other mathematical sciences were taught in Trebizond; medicine attracted the interest of almost all scholars. The Fall of Constantinople in 1453 fuelled the era later commonly known as the "Italian Renaissance". During this period, refugee Byzantine scholars were principally responsible for carrying, in person and writing, ancient Greek grammatical, literary studies, mathematical, and astronomical knowledge to early Renaissance Italy. They also brought with them classical learning and texts on botany, medicine and zoology, as well as the works of Dioscorides and John Philoponus' criticism of Aristotelian physics.

Culture

Religion 

The Byzantine Empire was a theocracy, said to be ruled by God working through the emperor. Jennifer Fretland VanVoorst argues, "The Byzantine Empire became a theocracy in the sense that Christian values and ideals were the foundation of the empire's political ideals and heavily entwined with its political goals." Steven Runciman says in his book:

The survival of the empire in the East assured an active role of the emperor in the affairs of the Church. The Byzantine state inherited from pagan times the administrative and financial routine of administering religious affairs, and this routine was applied to the Christian Church. Following the pattern set by Eusebius of Caesarea, the Byzantines viewed the emperor as a representative or messenger of Christ, responsible particularly for the propagation of Christianity among pagans, and for the "externals" of the religion, such as administration and finances. As Cyril Mango points out, the Byzantine political thinking can be summarised in the motto "One God, one empire, one religion".

Constantinople is generally considered the "cradle of Orthodox Christian civilization". The imperial role in the affairs of the Church never developed into a fixed, legally defined system. Additionally, the decline of Rome and the internal dissension in the other Eastern patriarchates, made the Church of Constantinople, between the 6th and 11th centuries, the richest and most influential centre of Christendom. Even when the empire was reduced to only a shadow of its former self, the Church continued to exercise significant influence both inside and outside of the imperial frontiers. As George Ostrogorsky points out:

Byzantine monasticism especially came to be an "ever-present feature" of the empire, with monasteries becoming "powerful landowners and a voice to be listened to in imperial politics".

The official state Christian doctrine was determined by the first seven ecumenical councils, and it was then the emperor's duty to impose it on his subjects. An imperial decree of 388, which was later incorporated into the Codex Justinianeus, orders the population of the empire "to assume the name of Catholic Christians", and regards all those who will not abide by the law as "mad and foolish persons"; as followers of "heretical dogmas".

Despite imperial decrees and the stringent stance of the state church, which came to be known as the Eastern Orthodox Church or Eastern Christianity, the Eastern Orthodox Church never represented all Christians in Byzantium. Mango believes that in the early stages of the empire, the "mad and foolish persons"—those labelled "heretics" by the state church—were the majority of the population. Besides the pagans who existed until the end of the 6th century, and the Jews, there were many followers—sometimes even emperors—of various Christian doctrines, such as Nestorianism, Monophysitism, Arianism, and Paulicianism, whose teachings were in some opposition to the main theological doctrine as determined by the Ecumenical Councils.

Another division among Christians occurred, when Leo III ordered the destruction of icons throughout the Empire. This led to a significant religious crisis, which ended in the mid-9th century with the restoration of icons. During the same period, a new wave of pagans emerged in the Balkans, originating mainly from Slavic people. These were gradually Christianised, and by Byzantium's late stages, Eastern Orthodoxy represented most Christians and, in general, most people in what remained of the empire.

Jews were a significant minority in the Byzantine state throughout its history, and according to Roman law, they constituted a legally recognised religious group. In the early Byzantine period they were generally tolerated, but then periods of tensions and persecutions ensued. In any case, after the Arab conquests the majority of Jews found themselves outside the empire; those left inside the Byzantine borders apparently lived in relative peace from the 10th century onwards.

The arts

Art 

Surviving Byzantine art is mostly religious and with exceptions at certain periods is highly conventionalised, following traditional models that translate carefully controlled church theology into artistic terms. Painting in fresco, illuminated manuscripts and on wood panel and, especially in earlier periods, mosaic were the main media, and figurative sculpture very rare except for small carved ivories. Manuscript painting preserved to the end some of the classical realist tradition that was missing in larger works. Byzantine art was highly prestigious and sought-after in Western Europe, where it maintained a continuous influence on medieval art until near the end of the period. This was especially so in Italy, where Byzantine styles persisted in modified form through the 12th century, and became formative influences on Italian Renaissance art. But few incoming influences affected the Byzantine style. With the expansion of the Eastern Orthodox Church, Byzantine forms and styles spread throughout the Orthodox world and beyond. 

Influences from Byzantine architecture, particularly in religious buildings, can be found in diverse regions from Egypt and Arabia to Russia and Romania. Byzantine architecture is known for the use of domes, and pendentive architecture was invented in the Byzantine Empire. It also often featured marble columns, coffered ceilings and sumptuous decoration, including the extensive use of mosaics with golden backgrounds. The building material used by Byzantine architects was no longer marble, which was very appreciated by the Ancient Greeks. They used mostly stone and brick, and also thin alabaster sheets for windows. Mosaics were used to cover brick walls, and any other surface where fresco wouldn't resist. Good examples of mosaics from the proto-Byzantine era are in Hagios Demetrios in Thessaloniki (Greece), the Basilica of Sant'Apollinare Nuovo and the Basilica of San Vitale, both in Ravenna (Italy), and Hagia Sophia in Istanbul. Greco-Roman temples and Byzantine churches differ substantially in terms of their exterior and interior aspect. In Antiquity, the exterior was the most important part of the temple, because in the interior, where the cult statue of the deity to whom the temple was built was kept, only the priest had access. The ceremonies here held outside, and what the worshipers view was the facade of the temple, consisting of columns, with an entablature and two pediments. Meanwhile, Christian liturgies were held in the interior of the churches, the exterior usually having little to no ornamentation.

Literature 

In Byzantine literature, three different cultural elements are recognised: the Greek, the Christian, and the Oriental. Byzantine literature is often classified in five groups: historians and annalists; encyclopaedists (Patriarch Photios, Michael Psellus, and Michael Choniates are regarded as the greatest encyclopaedists of Byzantium) and essayists; writers of secular poetry (the only genuine heroic epic of the Byzantines is the Digenis Acritas); ecclesiastical and theological literature; and popular poetry. Of the 2,000 to 3,000 volumes of Byzantine literature that survive, only 330 consist of secular poetry, history, science and pseudo-science. While the most flourishing period of the secular literature of Byzantium runs from the 9th to the 12th century, its religious literature (sermons, liturgical books and poetry, theology, devotional treatises, etc.) developed much earlier with Romanos the Melodist being its most prominent representative.

Music 

The ecclesiastical forms of Byzantine music—composed to Greek texts as ceremonial, festival, or church music—are today the most well-known forms. Ecclesiastical chants were a fundamental part of this genre. Greek and foreign historians agree that the ecclesiastical tones and in general the whole system of Byzantine music is closely related to the ancient Greek system. It remains the oldest genre of extant music, of which the manner of performance and (with increasing accuracy from the 5th century onwards) the names of the composers, and sometimes the particulars of each musical work's circumstances, are known.

The 9th-century Persian geographer Ibn Khordadbeh, in his lexicographical discussion of instruments, cited the lyra (lūrā) as the typical instrument of the Byzantines along with the urghun (organ), shilyani (probably a type of harp or lyre) and the salandj (probably a bagpipe). The first of these, the early bowed stringed instrument known as the Byzantine lyra, came to be called the lira da braccio, in Venice, where it is considered by many to have been the predecessor of the contemporary violin, which later flourished there. The bowed "lyra" is still played in former Byzantine regions, where it is known as the Politiki lyra (i.e. Constantinople) in Greece, the Calabrian lira in southern Italy, and the lijerica in Dalmatia. The water organ originated in the Hellenistic world and was used in the Hippodrome during races. A pipe organ with "great leaden pipes" was sent by Emperor Constantine V to Pepin the Short, King of the Franks in 757. Pepin's son Charlemagne requested a similar organ for his chapel in Aachen in 812, beginning its establishment in Western church music. The aulos was a double-reeded woodwind like the modern oboe or Armenian duduk. Other forms include the plagiaulos (πλαγίαυλος, from πλάγιος "sideways"), which resembled the flute, and the askaulos (ἀσκός askos – wineskin), a bagpipe. Bagpipes, also known as dankiyo (from ancient Greek: angion (Τὸ ἀγγεῖον) "the container"), had been played even in Roman times and continued to be played throughout the empire's former realms through to the present. (See Balkan Gaida, Greek Tsampouna, Pontic Tulum, Cretan Askomandoura, Armenian Parkapzuk, and Romanian Cimpoi.) The modern descendant of the aulos is the Greek Zourna. Other instruments used in Byzantine music were the Kanonaki, Oud, Laouto, Santouri, Tambouras, Seistron (defi tambourine), Toubeleki, and Daouli. Some claim that the Lavta may have been invented by the Byzantines before the arrival of the Turks.

Cuisine 

Byzantine culture was initially the same as Late Greco-Roman, but over the following millennium of the empire's existence it slowly changed into something more similar to modern Balkan and Anatolian culture. The cuisine still relied heavily on the Greco-Roman fish-sauce condiment garos, but it also contained foods still familiar today, such as the cured meat pastirma (known as "paston" in Byzantine Greek), baklava (known as koptoplakous κοπτοπλακοῦς), tiropita (known as plakountas tetyromenous or tyritas plakountas), and the famed medieval sweet wines (Malvasia from Monemvasia, Commandaria and the eponymous Rumney wine). Retsina, wine flavoured with pine resin, was also drunk, as it still is in Greece today, producing similar reactions from unfamiliar visitors; "To add to our calamity the Greek wine, on account of being mixed with pitch, resin, and plaster was to us undrinkable," complained Liutprand of Cremona, who was the ambassador sent to Constantinople in 968 by the German Holy Roman Emperor Otto I. The garos fish sauce condiment was also not much appreciated by the unaccustomed; Liutprand of Cremona described being served food covered in an "exceedingly bad fish liquor." The Byzantines also used a soy sauce-like condiment, murri, a fermented barley sauce, which, like soy sauce, provided umami flavouring to their dishes.

Flags and insignia 

For most of its history, the Byzantine Empire did not know or use heraldry in the West European sense. Various emblems (sēmeia; sing. σημείον, sēmeion) were used in official occasions and for military purposes, such as banners or shields displaying various motifs such as the cross or the labarum. The use of the cross and images of Christ, the Virgin Mary and various saints is also attested on seals of officials, but these were personal rather than family emblems.

Language 

Apart from the Imperial court, administration and military, the primary language used in the eastern Roman provinces even before the decline of the Western Empire was Greek, having been spoken in the region for centuries before Latin. Following Rome's conquest of the east its 'Pax Romana', inclusionist political practices and development of public infrastructure, facilitated the further spreading and entrenchment of the Greek language in the east. Indeed, early on in the life of the Roman Empire, Greek had become the common language of the Church, the language of scholarship and the arts, and to a large degree the lingua franca for trade between provinces and with other nations. Greek for a time became diglossic with the spoken language, known as Koine (eventually evolving into Demotic Greek), used alongside an older written form (Attic Greek) until Koine won out as the spoken and written standard.

The Emperor Diocletian sought to renew the authority of Latin, making it the official language of the Roman administration also in the East, and the Greek expression ἡ κρατοῦσα διάλεκτος (hē kratousa dialektos) attests to the status of Latin as "the language of power." In the early 5th century, Greek gained equal status with Latin as the official language in the East, and emperors gradually began to legislate in Greek rather than Latin starting with the reign of Leo I the Thracian in the 460s. The last Eastern emperor to stress the importance of Latin was Justinian I, whose Corpus Juris Civilis was written almost entirely in Latin. He may also have been the last native Latin-speaking emperor.

The use of Latin as the language of administration persisted for centuries, though it was increasingly replaced by Greek. Scholarly Latin rapidly fell into disuse among the educated classes although the language continued to be at least a ceremonial part of the Empire's culture for some time. Additionally, Latin remained a minority language in the empire, mainly on the Italian peninsula, along the Dalmatian coast and in the Balkans (specially in mountainous areas away from the coast), eventually developing into various Romance languages like Dalmatian or Romanian.

Many other languages existed in the multi-ethnic empire, and some of these were given limited official status in their provinces at various times. Notably, by the beginning of the Middle Ages, Syriac had become more widely used by the educated classes in the far eastern provinces. Similarly Coptic, Armenian, and Georgian became significant among the educated in their provinces. Later foreign contacts made Old Church Slavic, Middle Persian, and Arabic important in the empire and its sphere of influence. There was a revival of Latin studies in the 10th century for the same reason and by the 11th century knowledge of Latin was no longer unusual at Constantinople. There was widespread use of the Armenian and various Slavic languages, which became more pronounced in the border regions of the empire.

Aside from these languages, since Constantinople was a prime trading centre in the Mediterranean region and beyond, virtually every known language of the Middle Ages was spoken in the empire at some time, even Chinese. As the empire entered its final decline, its citizens became more culturally homogeneous and the Greek language became integral to their identity and religion.

Recreation 

Byzantines were avid players of tavli (Byzantine Greek: τάβλη), a game known in English as backgammon, which is still popular in former Byzantine realms and still known by the name tavli in Greece. Byzantine nobles were devoted to horsemanship, particularly tzykanion, now known as polo. The game came from Sassanid Persia, and a Tzykanisterion (stadium for playing the game) was built by Theodosius II inside the Great Palace of Constantinople. Emperor Basil I excelled at it; Emperor Alexander died from exhaustion while playing, Emperor Alexios I Komnenos was injured while playing with Tatikios, and John I of Trebizond died from a fatal injury during a game. Aside from Constantinople and Trebizond, other Byzantine cities also featured tzykanisteria, most notably Sparta, Ephesus, and Athens, an indication of a thriving urban aristocracy. The game was introduced to the West by crusaders, who developed a taste for it particularly during the pro-Western reign of Emperor Manuel I Komnenos. Chariot races were popular and held at hippodromes across the empire. There were initially four major factions in chariot racing, differentiated by the colour of the uniform in which they competed; the colours were also worn by their supporters. These were the Blues (Veneti), the Greens (Prasini), the Reds (Russati), and the Whites (Albati), although by the Byzantine era the only teams with any influence were the Blues and Greens. Emperor Justinian I was a supporter of the Blues.

Women 

The position of women in the Byzantine Empire essentially represents the position of women in ancient Rome transformed by the introduction of Christianity, with certain rights and customs being lost and replaced, while others were allowed to remain. There were individual Byzantine women famed for their educational accomplishments. However, the general view of women's education was that it was sufficient for a girl to learn domestic duties and to study the lives of the Christian saints and memorize psalms, and to learn to read so that she could study Bible scriptures—although literacy in women was sometimes discouraged because it was believed it could encourage vice.

The Roman right to divorce was gradually erased after the introduction of Christianity and replaced with legal separation and annulment. Marriage was regarded as the ideal state for a woman, and only convent life was seen as a legitimate alternative. Within marriage, sexual activity was regarded only as a means of reproduction. Women had the right to appear before court, but her testimony was not regarded as equal to that of a man and could be contradicted based on her sex if put against that of a man.

From the 6th century there was a growing ideal of gender segregation, which dictated that women should wear veils and only be seen in public when attending church, and while the ideal was never fully enforced, it influenced society. The laws of Emperor Justinian I made it legal for a man to divorce his wife for attending public premises such as theatres or public baths without his permission, and Emperor Leo VI banned women from witnessing business contracts with the argument that it caused them to come in contact with men.  In Constantinople, upper-class women were increasingly expected to keep to a special women's section (gynaikonitis), and by the 8th century it was described as unacceptable for unmarried daughters to meet unrelated men.  While imperial women and their ladies appeared in public alongside men, women and men at the imperial court attended royal banquets separately until the rise of the Komnenos dynasty in the 12th century.

Eastern Roman and later Byzantine women retained the Roman woman's right to inherit, own and manage their property and signs contracts, rights which were far superior to the rights of married women in Medieval Catholic Western Europe, as these rights included both married women as well as unmarried women and widows.  Women's legal right to handle their own money made it possible for rich women to engage in business, however women who actively had to find a profession to support themselves normally worked as domestics or in domestic fields such as the food or textile industry.  Women could work as medical physicians and attendants of women patients and visitors at hospitals and public baths with government support.

After the introduction of Christianity, women could no longer become priestesses, but it became common for women to found and manage nunneries, which functioned as schools for girls as well as asylums, poor houses, hospitals, prisons and retirement homes for women, and many Byzantine women practised social work as lay sisters and deaconesses.

Economy 

The Byzantine economy was among the most advanced in Europe and the Mediterranean for many centuries. Europe, in particular, could not match Byzantine economic strength until late in the Middle Ages. Constantinople operated as a prime hub in a trading network that at various times extended across nearly all of Eurasia and North Africa, in particular as the primary western terminus of the famous Silk Road. Until the first half of the 6th century and in sharp contrast with the decaying West, the Byzantine economy was flourishing and resilient.

The Plague of Justinian and the Arab conquests represented a substantial reversal of fortunes contributing to a period of stagnation and decline. Isaurian reforms and Constantine V's repopulation, public works and tax measures marked the beginning of a revival that continued until 1204, despite territorial contraction. From the 10th century until the end of the 12th, the Byzantine Empire projected an image of luxury and travellers were impressed by the wealth accumulated in the capital.

The Fourth Crusade resulted in the disruption of Byzantine manufacturing and the commercial dominance of the Western Europeans in the eastern Mediterranean, events that amounted to an economic catastrophe for the empire. The Palaiologoi tried to revive the economy, but the late Byzantine state did not gain full control of either the foreign or domestic economic forces. Gradually, Constantinople also lost its influence on the modalities of trade and the price mechanisms, and its control over the outflow of precious metals and, according to some scholars, even over the minting of coins.

One of the economic foundations of Byzantium was trade, fostered by the maritime character of the empire. Textiles must have been by far the most important item of export; silks were certainly imported into Egypt and appeared also in Bulgaria, and the West. The state strictly controlled both the internal and the international trade, and retained the monopoly of issuing coinage, maintaining a durable and flexible monetary system adaptable to trade needs.

The government attempted to exercise formal control over interest rates and set the parameters for the activity of the guilds and corporations, in which it had a special interest. The emperor and his officials intervened at times of crisis to ensure the provisioning of the capital, and to keep down the price of cereals. Finally, the government often collected part of the surplus through taxation, and put it back into circulation, through redistribution in the form of salaries to state officials, or in the form of investment in public works.

Legacy 

Byzantium has been often identified with absolutism, orthodox spirituality, orientalism and exoticism, while the terms "Byzantine" and "Byzantinism" have been used as bywords for decadence, complex bureaucracy, and repression. Both Eastern and Western European authors have often perceived Byzantium as a body of religious, political, and philosophical ideas contrary to those of the West. Even in 19th-century Greece, the focus was mainly on the classical past, while Byzantine tradition had been associated with negative connotations.

This traditional approach towards Byzantium has been partially or wholly disputed and revised by modern studies, which focus on the positive aspects of Byzantine culture and legacy. Averil Cameron regards as undeniable the Byzantine contribution to the formation of medieval Europe, and both Cameron and Obolensky recognise the major role of Byzantium in shaping Orthodoxy, which in turn occupies a central position in the history, societies and culture of Greece, Romania, Bulgaria, Russia, Georgia, Serbia and other countries. The Byzantines also preserved and copied classical manuscripts, and they are thus regarded as transmitters of classical knowledge, as important contributors to modern European civilisation, and as precursors of both Renaissance humanism and Slavic-Orthodox culture. Some scholars focused on the positive aspects of Byzantine culture and legacy, French historian Charles Diehl describes the Byzantine Empire by saying:

As the only stable long-term state in Europe during the Middle Ages, Byzantium isolated Western Europe from newly emerging forces to the East. Constantly under attack, it distanced Western Europe from Persians, Arabs, Seljuk Turks, and for a time, the Ottomans. From a different perspective, since the 7th century, the evolution and constant reshaping of the Byzantine state were directly related to the respective progress of Islam. Following the conquest of Constantinople by the Ottoman Turks in 1453, Sultan Mehmed II took the title "Kaysar-i Rûm" (the Ottoman Turkish equivalent of Caesar of Rome), since he was determined to make the Ottoman Empire the heir of the Eastern Roman Empire.

See also 
 Family tree of Byzantine emperors
 Index of Byzantine Empire–related articles
 Legacy of the Roman Empire
 List of Byzantine revolts and civil wars
 List of Byzantine wars
 List of Roman dynasties
 Succession of the Roman Empire

References

Notes

Citations

Sources

Primary sources

  (in Greek)

Secondary sources

Further reading 

 
 
 Baboula, Evanthia, Byzantium, in Muhammad in History, Thought, and Culture: An Encyclopedia of the Prophet of God (2 vols.), Edited by C. Fitzpatrick and A. Walker, Santa Barbara, ABC-CLIO, 2014. .
 
 
 
 
 
 
  online review 
 
 
 
 Moles Ian N., "Nationalism and Byzantine Greece", Greek Roman and Byzantine Studies, Duke University, pp. 95–107, 1969

External links 

 
 De Imperatoribus Romanis. Scholarly biographies of many Byzantine emperors.
 12 Byzantine Rulers  by Lars Brownworth of The Stony Brook School; audio lectures. NYTimes review.
 18 centuries of Roman Empire by Howard Wiseman (Maps of the Roman/Byzantine Empire throughout its lifetime).
 Byzantine & Christian Museum

 Byzantine studies, resources and bibliography
 Fox, Clinton R. "What, If Anything, Is a Byzantine?" (Online Encyclopedia of Roman Emperors)
 Byzantine studies homepage at Dumbarton Oaks. Includes links to numerous electronic texts.
 Byzantium: Byzantine studies on the Internet. Links to various online resources.
 Translations from Byzantine Sources: The Imperial Centuries, c. 700–1204. Online sourcebook.
 De Re Militari. Resources for medieval history, including numerous translated sources on the Byzantine wars.
 Medieval Sourcebook: Byzantium. Numerous primary sources on Byzantine history.
 Bibliography on Byzantine Material Culture and Daily Life. Hosted by the University of Vienna; in English.
 Constantinople Home Page. Links to texts, images and videos on Byzantium.
 Byzantium in Crimea: Political History, Art and Culture.
 Institute for Byzantine Studies of the Austrian Academy of Sciences (with further resources and a repository with papers on various aspects of the Byzantine Empire)

 
286 establishments
330s establishments
1453 disestablishments in Europe
1453 disestablishments in Asia
Christendom
States and territories established in the 390s
States and territories disestablished in 1453
Christian states
Former countries in Africa
Former countries in the Balkans
Former countries in Europe
Former countries in the Middle East
Former countries in Western Asia
Tributary states of the Ottoman Empire
Historical transcontinental empires
Former empires